Teerasak Po-on (born 18 May 1978) is a Thai professional football manager and former player, who is the current manager of Thai League 1 club Nakhon Ratchasima.

International career
Teerasak played for Thailand at the 1997 FIFA U-17 World Championship in Egypt.

Managerial statistics

Honours

Player
Krung Thai Bank
 Thai Premier League: 2003–04

Chonburi
 Thai Premier League: 2007
 Kor Royal Cup: 2008, 2009

Thailand
 AFC U-17 Championship runners-up: 1996

Manager
PTT Rayong
 Thai League 2: 2018

Individual
Thai League 1 Coach of the Month: March 2016

References

External links
Teerasak Po-on at Soccerway

1978 births
Living people
Teerasak Po-on
Teerasak Po-on
Teerasak Po-on
Teerasak Po-on
Teerasak Po-on
Association football midfielders
Teerasak Po-on
Teerasak Po-on
Player-coaches
Teerasak Po-on
Thai expatriate sportspeople in Singapore